The 12th Man is the fourth studio album by American hip hop duo The High & Mighty. It was released on May 31, 2005, via Eastern Conference Records and was produced entirely by DJ Mighty Mi. It featured guest appearances from Sean Price, Princess Superstar, Reef the Lost Cauze and Tame One.

Track listing

Sample credits
Track 2 contains elements from "Sonnet" by Alla Pugachova
Track 4 contains elements from "L'étrange Docteur Personne" by Caravelli
Track 5 contains elements from "Change" by Face Dancer
Track 10 contains elements from "Andiamo a Mietere Il Grano" by Louiselle

Personnel
Erik Meltzer – main artist, vocals
Milo Berger – main artist, producer
Sean Price – featured artist (tracks: 5, 12)
Sharif Talib Lacey – featured artist (track 7)
Rahem Brown – featured artist (track 10)
Concetta Kirschner – featured artist (track 11)
Joey Raia – mixing
Michael Sarsfield – mastering

References

External links

2005 albums
East Coast hip hop albums
Eastern Conference Records albums